The Men's singles race of the 2015 FIL World Luge Championships was held on 15 February 2015.

Results
The first run was started at 10:14 and the second run at 12:12.

References

Men's singles